Sooretama Biological Reserve ( is a biological reserve in  the state of Espírito Santo, Brazil.

History

These were merged on 20 September 1982 to create the biological reserve.
It became part of the Central Atlantic Forest Ecological Corridor, created in 2002.

It is administered by the Chico Mendes Institute for Biodiversity Conservation.
It covers parts of the municipalities of Jaguaré, Linhares, Vila Valério and Sooretama.

Status

The Biological Reserve is a "strict nature reserve" under IUCN protected area category Ia.
Its purpose is to preserve the biota and other natural attributes without human interference.
Tableland Atlantic Forest in Acrisols (Yellow) and Acrisols (Gray) (WRB) or Argissolos Amarelos and Argissolos Acinzentados (SiBCS, Brazil). Includes Vegetal Formation called Mussununga in Podzol (WRB) or Espodossolos (SiBCS, Brazil).

Protected birds include the red-browed amazon (Amazona rhodocorytha), white-necked hawk (Buteogallus lacernulatus), Atlantic black-breasted woodpecker (Celeus tinnunculus), black-headed berryeater (Carpornis melanocephala),  yellow-legged tinamou (Crypturellus noctivagus), red-billed curassow (Crax blumenbachii), banded cotinga (Cotinga maculata), band-tailed antwren (Myrmotherula urosticta), scalloped antbird (Myrmeciza ruficauda),  rufous-vented ground cuckoo (Neomorphus geoffroyi), golden-green woodpecker (Piculus chrysochloros), white-eared parakeet (Pyrrhura leucotis), ochre-marked parakeet (Pyrrhura cruentata) and striated softtail (Thripophaga macroura).

Other protected species include the northern brown howler (Alouatta guariba guariba), Atlantic titi (Callicebus personatus), giant armadillo (Priodontes maximus), giant otter (Pteronura brasiliensis), cougar (Puma concolor), jaguar (Panthera onca), oncilla (Leopardus tigrinus), ocelot (Leopardus pardalis), the ant Dinoponera lucida, Hercules beetle (Dynastes hercules) and the Characiformes fish Rachoviscus graciliceps.

References

Sources

1982 establishments in Brazil
Biological reserves of Brazil
Protected areas of Espírito Santo
Protected areas established in 1982
Protected areas of the Atlantic Forest